Not in Heaven (לֹא בַשָּׁמַיִם הִיא, lo ba-shamayim hi) is a phrase found in a Biblical verse, which encompasses the passage's theme, and takes on additional significance in rabbinic Judaism.

In its literal or plain meaning, the verse means that God's commands are not overwhelming but rather close to human hearts and abilities to obey. As noted in the New Oxford Annotated Bible, "The covenant demand is not beyond human reach or understanding but has been graciously revealed... 'the word is near you.'" The full verse states: "It is not in heaven, that you should say, 'Who will go up to heaven for us, and get it for us so that we may hear it and observe it?' In general, the verse conforms with how "... the deuteronomic tradition believed its Torah to be an immediately accessible wisdom, neither distant nor wondrous."

Jewish interpretations 

The phrase "not in Heaven" is understood to justify human authority to interpret the Torah. The Talmud explains "[The Torah] is not in Heaven" to mean that the meaning of the Torah itself is to be uncovered not by prophets, or even God's miracles or words, but by humankind's interpretation and decision-making. In the story of the Oven of Akhnai,  "Rabbi Yehoshua affirmed the independence of human interpretation from divine intervention since this is what God wills. In support he adduces the biblical statement that the Torah is 'not in heaven'."

In the academic study of Jewish law, the verse "not in Heaven" serves as the Biblical grounding for the jurisprudential structure of halakhah (Jewish law). As one author explains, thanks to the midrashic reading of the verse, "...God himself acquiesced in His exclusion from the halakhic process. Having revealed His will in Sinai in the grundnorm, He Himself, according to the Rabbinic explanation, entrusted the interpretation of His will to the Sages."

See also 
Eliezer ben Hurcanus, against whom Rabbi Yehoshua cited "not in Heaven" on the case of The Oven of Akhnai

Bibliography 
Maimonides. Mishneh Torah, Foundations of the Torah 9:1-4 (E.g., "it is said 'It is not in heaven' -- you thus learn that henceforth no prophet is authorized to innovate anything." Walzer p. 269)
Berkovits, Eliezer. Not in Heaven: The Nature and Function of Halakhah. (NY, 1983) Cf. "Conversion and the Oral Law" reprinted in Essential Essays on Judaism (Jerusalem: Shalem Press, 2006).
Boyarin, Daniel. "Old Wine in New Bottles: Intertextuality and Midrash." Poetics Today, 1987
Gordis, Robert. The Dynamics of Judaism: A Study in Jewish Law. (Indiana UP:1990)
JP Rosenblatt, JC Sitterson. Not in Heaven: Coherence and Complexity in Biblical Narrative (Indiana UP:1991)
Walzer, et al. The Jewish Political Tradition: Authority (Yale 2000)

References

Jewish law principles
Jewish philosophy
Biblical phrases